The rule of mutual exclusion in molecular spectroscopy relates the observation of molecular vibrations to molecular symmetry. It states that no normal modes can be both Infrared and Raman active in a molecule that possesses a centre of symmetry. This is a powerful application of group theory to vibrational spectroscopy, and allows one to easily detect the presence of this symmetry element by comparison of the IR and Raman spectra generated by the same molecule.

The rule arises because in a centrosymmetric point group, IR active modes, which must transform according to the same irreducible representation generated by one of the components of the dipole moment vector (x, y or z), must be of ungerade (u) symmetry, i.e. their character under inversion is -1, while Raman active modes, which transform according to the symmetry of the polarizability tensor (product of two coordinates), must be of gerade (g) symmetry since their character under inversion is +1. Thus, in the character table there is no irreducible representation that spans both IR and Raman active modes, and so there is no overlap between the two spectra.

This does not mean that a vibrational mode which is not Raman active must be IR active: in fact, it is still possible that a mode of a particular symmetry is neither Raman nor IR active. Such spectroscopically "silent" or "inactive" modes exist in molecules such as ethylene (C2H4), benzene (C6H6) and the tetrachloroplatinate ion (PtCl42−).

References 

Raman spectroscopy
Infrared spectroscopy
Theoretical chemistry